Warren Clark may refer to:

 Warren Clark Jr. (1936–2018), American diplomat
 E. Warren Clark (1849–1907), American educator

See also
 Warren Clarke (1947–2014), English actor